The men's 200 metre breaststroke event at the 2012 Summer Olympics took place on 31 July and 1 August at the London Aquatics Centre in London, United Kingdom.

Hungary's Dániel Gyurta blasted the field with a stunning world record to become the country's third gold medalist in the event since József Szabó topped the podium in 1988 and Norbert Rózsa in 1996. Turning second at the halfway mark, he threw down a remarkable time of 2:07.28 on the final stretch to shave 0.03 seconds off the record set by Australia's Christian Sprenger in a since-banned high tech bodysuit from the 2009 World Championships. With the delight of a raucous home crowd, Great Britain's Michael Jamieson enjoyed the race of his life to snatch the silver in 2:07.43, moving him up to fourth in the event's all time rankings. Meanwhile, Japan's Ryo Tateishi powered home with a bronze in 2:08.29 to edge out Kosuke Kitajima (2:08.35) by six-hundredths of a second, ending the defending champion's hopes for an Olympic three-peat bid.

U.S. swimmer Scott Weltz finished fifth in 2:09.02 to hold off his teammate Clark Burckle (2:09.25) by 23-hundredths of a second. Australia's Brenton Rickard (2:09.28), the reigning silver medalist, and Great Britain's home favorite Andrew Willis (2:09.44) rounded out the championship field.

Notable swimmers missed the final roster featuring Lithuania's Giedrius Titenis, a top eight finalist in the 100 m breaststroke; and Luxembourg's Laurent Carnol, who became the nation's first ever semifinalist in swimming.

Records
Prior to this competition, the existing world and Olympic records were as follows.

The following records were established during the competition:

Results

Heats

Semifinals

Semifinal 1

Semifinal 2

Final

References

External links
NBC Olympics Coverage

Men's 00200 metre breaststroke
Men's events at the 2012 Summer Olympics